Salaheddine Benyachou is a Moroccan professional footballer who plays as a forward for Botola club Wydad AC.

Club career

OC Safi 
After starting his youth career at OC Safi. On 5 December 2020, he played his first full game for the OC Safi where he scored a super hat-trick in a 4–3 win over Difaâ Hassani El Jadidi.

Wydad AC 
In August 2021, Benyachou signed up with Wydad AC for an amount of 3 million dirhams.

References

Moroccan footballers
Olympic Club de Safi players
Wydad AC players
1999 births
Living people
Association football forwards